Langsdorfia dukinfieldi is a moth in the family Cossidae. It is found in Brazil (Para).

References

Natural History Museum Lepidoptera generic names catalog

Hypoptinae